Jeffery Jones (born February 8, 1958) is the former Mayor of Paterson, the third largest city in New Jersey. He served from 2010 to 2014. The Paterson City Council  censured Mayor Jeffery Jones for refusing to testify about why he and top salaried officials received nearly $51,000 in overtime following Hurricane Irene.

References

1958 births
Living people
Mayors of Paterson, New Jersey
New Jersey Democrats
African-American mayors in New Jersey
21st-century African-American people
20th-century African-American people